San José is a localidad (district) located in the south of Lomas de Zamora Partido in Buenos Aires Province, it forms part of the Greater Buenos Aires conurbation.

The neighborhood, named after Saint Joseph, traces its origins to 1948, when a region of semi-rural terrain between Temperley and Quilmes was developed.

External links
 History of San José 

Populated places in Buenos Aires Province
Lomas de Zamora Partido